The 2005 Chevy Rock & Roll 400 was the 26th stock car race of the 2005 NASCAR Nextel Cup Series season, the final race of the regular season, and the 48th iteration of the event. The race was held on Saturday, September 10, 2005, before a sold-out crowd of 107,000 in Richmond, Virginia, at Richmond International Raceway, a 0.75 miles (1.21 km) D-shaped oval. The race took the scheduled 400 laps to complete. At race's end, Kurt Busch of Roush Racing would take control of the race in the late stages of the race to win his 14th career NASCAR Nextel Cup Series win and his third and final win of the season. To fill out the podium, Busch's teammates, Matt Kenseth and Greg Biffle would finish second and third, respectively.

The ten drivers who would make the second edition of the Chase for the Nextel Cup were Tony Stewart, Greg Biffle, Rusty Wallace, Jimmie Johnson, Kurt Busch, Mark Martin, Jeremy Mayfield, Carl Edwards, Matt Kenseth, and Ryan Newman.

Background 

Richmond International Raceway (RIR) is a 3/4-mile (1.2 km), D-shaped, asphalt race track located just outside Richmond, Virginia in Henrico County. It hosts the Monster Energy NASCAR Cup Series and Xfinity Series. Known as "America's premier short track", it formerly hosted a NASCAR Camping World Truck Series race, an IndyCar Series race, and two USAC sprint car races.

Entry list

Practice 
The only 2-hour practice session would start on Friday, September 9, at 12:00 PM EST.

Qualifying 
Qualifying was held on Friday, September 9, at 6:10 PM EST. Each driver would have two laps to set a fastest time; the fastest of the two would count as their official qualifying lap.

Kirk Shelmerdine would crash on his second lap coming into turn 3, spinning and hitting the Turn 3-4 wall. While he had set a lap time, the time was not good enough to get him into the race, making Shelmerdine not qualify for the race.

Seven drivers would fail to qualify: Wayne Peterson, Stanton Barrett, Carl Long, Hermie Sadler, Morgan Shepherd, Joey McCarthy, and Kirk Shelmerdine.

Race results

References 

2005 NASCAR Nextel Cup Series
NASCAR races at Richmond Raceway
September 2005 sports events in the United States
2005 in sports in Virginia